Shikar is a 2006 Bengali-language film written and directed by Saran Dutta and produced under the banner of Cine Friends 2003. The film stars actors Koel Mallick, Amitabh Bhattacharjee and Rajesh Sharma. Music of the film has been composed by Ashok Bhadra. The film released on 1 December 2006.

Plot 
An astrologer by profession, Baburam Panja (Shantilal Mukherjee) is the gang-leader of a group of goons who murder people for money. Saheb (Amitabh Bhattacharjee), Hero (Sagnik Chattopadhyay) and Khyapa (Kanchan Mullick) are three skilled members of his group. Police officer Rajesh Yadav (Rajesh Sharma), who knows about the misdeeds of Baburam, hatches a plan to catch him. He gets hold of Saheb, whom he thought as a bait to catch Baburam. In the police station, Saheb was beaten to death. However, later the fact is revealed that the person, whom Rajesh mistook as Saheb, was actually Bimal, his lookalike. Seema (Koel Mallick), Bimal's wife, tried to save him, but was unfortunately sent to a brothel. In the brothel, Seema attempted to commit suicide, but was saved by Reshmi (June Malia) and some other people. On the other hand, Saheb, Khyapa and Hero visited the brothel and came across all the facts that happened with Seema. Saheb, who became extremely wrathful on hearing what happened with the innocent couple, decided to save Seema from Baburam by killing him. Meanwhile, Rajesh came to know about the real incident and his mistake. He became furious upon realizing that Saheb was still alive in the brothel. He again arranges a plot, where he uses Baburam as the bait. He thought that after Saheb kills Baburam, he will kill him too. A dramatic encounter follows the events after the trio kill Baburam, where Khyapa and Hero died and Saheb was released by Rajesh who felt pity for him. A severely injured Saheb returns to the brothel to meet Seema, who in the course of incidents, fell in love with him. The film ends as Saheb and Seema leave the brothel to start a new life together.

Cast 
 Koel Mallick as Seema
 Amitabh Bhattacharjee as Saheb/Bimal
 Rajesh Sharma as Police Officer Rajesh Yadav
 Shantilal Mukhopadhyay as Baburam Panja
 Kanchan Mullick as Khyapa
 Sagnik Chattopadhyay as Hero
 June Malia as Reshmi
 Kharaj Mukherjee as Ramu
 Tapas Paul as a police officer

Soundtrack 

Ashok Bhadra composed the music for Shikar. Lyrics are penned by Saran Dutta and Priyo Chattopadhyay.

Track listing

References 

2000s Bengali-language films
Films scored by Ashok Bhadra
Bengali-language Indian films